Canadian Adaptive Snowsports (CADS) is a national charity that assists individuals with disabilities to lead richer lives through snow skiing and snowboarding.  CADS is the national level organization consisting of 11 divisions and 67 Programs across Canada. In 2019, there were more than 5,200 members committed to the mission of giving people living with disabilities the opportunity to eliminate the barriers that prevent them from enjoying snowsports in Canada.  CADS serves participants with all disabilities including people with visual impairments, autism spectrum disorders and cognitive impairments and physical impairments.

Training
Skiers and Snowboarders who wish to pursue training in the field of adaptive skiing and snowboarding are encouraged to contact CADS or visit the CADS Site www.cads.ski for Instructor Certification dates or for more information. CADS Instructor certifications are CSIA Accredited courses and are worth 10 educational points towards your CSIA Certification pathway.

CADS welcomes both fully able and disabled skiers and snowboarders to its training programs and short certification clinics.

References

See also

Internal links

 Canadian Ski Instructors' Alliance
 Canadian Association of Snowboard Instructors

External links

 CADS website

Skiing organizations
Parasports organizations
Disability organizations based in Canada